Knockin Castle is situated in the village of Knockin on Shropshire between Oswestry and Shrewsbury, England.

This was a motte-and-bailey castle founded by Guy le Strange between 1154 and 1160 and it remained the principal holding of the le Strange family for most of the Middle Ages. The castle was damaged in the First Barons' War during the reign of King John and then repaired by John le Strange. It was described as being 'ruinous' in 1540.

All that remains of Knockin Castle today is a large tree-covered mound of earth.

References
Knockin Castle 2
Fry, Plantagenet Somerset, The David & Charles Book of Castles, David & Charles, 1980, p. 250. 

Castles in Shropshire